Darland Banks is a   Local Nature Reserve on the southern outskirts of Gillingham in Kent. It is owned by Medway Council and managed by Kent Wildlife Trust.

This area of grassland, scrub and woodland has diverse fauna and flora, including the largest population of man orchids in Britain. There are birds such as willow warbler, yellowhammer, linnet and lesser whitethroat.

There is access from Darland Avenue.

References

Kent Wildlife Trust
Local Nature Reserves in Kent